Andrew Loton Fekete (born 18 May 1985) is an Australian cricketer who has played for Victoria and Tasmania.

The Victorian-born Fekete made his List A debut for Victoria in February 2012. He took 2/42, but broke his foot while bowling, courtesy of a powerful hit by Theo Doropoulos. Fekete's next game came in February 2013, after almost a year and a move to Tasmania. In October 2013, he played his third List A match, took 4/38, and earned the man of the match award.

Fekete made his first class debut in November 2013. In the 2014–15 Sheffield Shield season, he was the second highest wicket-taker, taking 37 wickets at 24.10. He played two matches for Australia A in July 2015, and in September was selected as part of the Australian Test squad for its tour of Bangladesh.

Fekete signed for the Sydney Thunder in the Big Bash League during the 2017–18 Big Bash League season.

In March 2018, Fekete took career-best match figures in Tasmania's fixture against Victoria to progress Tasmania to the final of the 2017–18 Sheffield Shield season.

References 

Living people
1985 births
Tasmania cricketers
Victoria cricketers
Australian cricketers
Australian people of Hungarian descent
Brisbane Heat cricketers
Melbourne Renegades cricketers
Sydney Thunder cricketers